The Johnston Memorial Building is a historic building in Wallace, Nebraska. It was built in 1921 in memory of John R. Johnston, the founder of the Johnston Brokerage Company, a Pittsburgh, Pennsylvania-based window glass manufacturing company, who vacationed in Wallace. The building was designed in a "pleasing" combination of Prairie School and Craftsman styles by noted architect Francis W. Fitzpatrick.
It was built by McMichael Bros.  It has been listed on the National Register of Historic Places since March 20, 1986.

References

	
National Register of Historic Places in Lincoln County, Nebraska
Prairie School architecture in Nebraska
Buildings and structures completed in 1921
1921 establishments in Nebraska